Tuscarora may refer to the following:

First nations and Native American people and culture 
 Tuscarora people
Federal Power Commission v. Tuscarora Indian Nation (1960)
 Tuscarora language, an Iroquoian language of the Tuscarora people
 Tuscarora Reservation, territory of the Tuscarora Nation in New York
 Tuscarora War, fought in North Carolina during the autumn of 1711 until 11 February 1715

Places
In Maryland
Tuscarora, Maryland, a census-designated place in Frederick County
Tuscarora High School (Maryland), in Frederick

In Michigan
Tuscarora Township, Michigan

In Nevada
Tuscarora, Nevada, a town in Elko County
Tuscarora Mountains, a range in Elko County

In New York
Tuscarora, New York, a town in Steuben County
Tuscarora (CDP), New York, a hamlet in Livingston County
Tuscarora Reservation, an Indian reservation in the town of Lewiston
Camp Tuscarora, a Boy Scouts of America camp in New York State's Southern Tier

In North Dakota
 Tuscarora Township, Pierce County, North Dakota

In Pennsylvania
Tuscarora, Pennsylvania, a census-designated place in Schuylkill County
Tuscarora Falls, one of 24 named waterfalls in Ricketts Glen State Park in Luzerne County
Tuscarora Mountain
Tuscarora Mountain Tunnel, Pennsylvania Turnpike
Tuscarora State Forest
Tuscarora Township, Bradford County, Pennsylvania
Tuscarora Township, Juniata County, Pennsylvania
Tuscarora Township, Perry County, Pennsylvania
Tuscarora Trail, a hiking trail that splits off from the Appalachian Trail
Tuscarora School District, in southern Pennsylvania

In Virginia
Tuscarora High School (Virginia), in Leesburg

Other
 USS Tuscarora (1861), U.S. Navy American Civil War ship
 CSS Tuscarora, Confederate States ship
 USRC Tuscarora (1902), U.S. Revenue Cutter Service and U.S Coast Guard cutter in commission from 1902–1936
 Tuscarora Creek (disambiguation), several waterways
 The Tuscarora, Captain Alfred Bulltop Stormalong's legendary ship
 Tuscarora Formation, a geologic unit in the Appalachian Mountains
 Tuscarora Gas Pipeline, a gas pipeline running from Malin, Oregon to Wadsworth, Nevada
 Tuscarora Phillips, the character played by Christopher Mitchum in the 1970 Howard Hawks' film Rio Lobo

See also

Language and nationality disambiguation pages